Gigi Talcott (born December 14, 1944) is an American politician who served in the Washington House of Representatives from the 28th district from 1993 to 2007.

References

1944 births
Living people
Republican Party members of the Washington House of Representatives
Women state legislators in Washington (state)